The Belgian Bowl XII was played in 1999 and was won by the Antwerp Diamonds.

References

External links
Official Belgian Bowl website

American football in Belgium
Belgian Bowl
Belgian Bowl